Ennio Cerlesi (21 January 1901 – 1 February 1951) was an Italian film actor. He played the title role in the 1937 film Doctor Antonio. Cerlesi was also a leading voice actor, dubbing international films for release in Italy. He also directed the 1946 film One Between the Crowd. Cerlesi was married to actress Emma Baron, who was also a frequent partner on stage.

Selected filmography
 The Blue Fleet (1932)
 Golden Arrow (1935)
 Doctor Antonio (1937)
 Giuseppe Verdi (1938)
 Naples Will Never Die (1939)
 The Ten Commandments (1945)

References

External links

Sources
 Goble, Alan. The Complete Index to Literary Sources in Film. Walter de Gruyter, 1999.

1901 births
1951 deaths
Italian male film actors
Italian male voice actors
Actors from Turin
20th-century Italian male actors